Misel Klesinger (born 8 July 1969) is a Yugoslav-born tennis player. In 2008, he had had 16 years of experience coaching in Germany and elsewhere.

In 1986 he was ranked No. 17 in the International Tennis Federation Junior category. That year he played in Wimbledon and Paris, and was ranked No. 736 by the Association of Tennis Professionals.

From 2008 Klesinger was coaching in Dubai.

References

1969 births
Living people
Yugoslav male tennis players
Croatian male tennis players